Freneuse may refer to the following communes in France:

Freneuse, Seine-Maritime, in the Seine-Maritime département
Freneuse, Yvelines, in the Yvelines département
Freneuse-sur-Risle, in the Eure département